Thunderdome is an arena for steel-cage fights to the death in the 1985 Australian post-apocalyptic film Mad Max Beyond Thunderdome.

Thunderdome may also refer to:

Music
 "We Don't Need Another Hero" (Thunderdome), a 1985 song by Tina Turner featured in the film
 Thunderdome (album), a 2004 album by the German melodic-metal band Pink Cream 69
 Thunderdome (music festival), a gabber music event in the Netherlands

Sports facilities

United States
 ThunderDome (St. Petersburg, Florida), the former name of Tropicana Field, a domed stadium in St. Petersburg, Florida
 WWE ThunderDome, WWE's behind closed doors arena production and staging during the COVID-19 pandemic 
 A nickname for Paycom Center, a multi-purpose arena in Oklahoma City, Oklahoma
 A nickname for Hubert H. Humphrey Metrodome, a former domed stadium in Minneapolis, Minnesota
 A nickname for the UC Santa Barbara Events Center, an indoor multi-purpose arena at the University of California, Santa Barbara, California

Other locations
 Thunderdome Stadium, a former name of SCG Stadium, Muang Thong Thani, Nonthaburi, Thailand
 Calder Park Thunderdome, an oval speedway in Melbourne, Australia
 A former name of Gateshead International Stadium, England

Attractions
 Death Guild Thunderdome, a popular regular feature at Burning Man, recreating the arena from the film Mad Max Beyond Thunderdome at the Death Guild camp